The Kugu Nganhcara, also Wikngenchera, Wik-Ngandjara (Ngandjara)  are an Australian group of peoples living in the middle western part of the Cape York Peninsula, Queensland in Australia. Today they are primarily concentrated at Aurukan and the Edward river settlement.

Language
Kugu Nganhcara is a Wik-language complex consisting of six varieties or patrilects, Kugu Uwanh, Kugu Ugbanh, Kugu Yi'anh, Kugu Mi'inh, Kugu Miminh, and Wik Iyanh, where 'kugu' is a classifier for speech, and the following word the infinitive of the respective verbs for 'go'. These closely related languages are called patrilects by Steve Johnson since the respective groups belong to a society composed of patrilineal clans joined by exogamous relationships.

Country
The northern bounds of the Kugu Nganhcara are around the Kendall River, and their southern limits are  around Moonkan Creek, beyond which lie their southern neighbours the Thaayorre.

Socio-linguistic division markers
The Kugu-Nganychara embrace the following groups:
Kugu Miminh
Kugu-Mu'inh
Kugu Uwanh
Kugu Ugbanh
Kugu-Mangk
Kugu Yi'anh
Wik-Iiyanh
Kugu Mi'ing
Wik Iyanh

Wiknantjara
Peter Sutton remarks that this term does not refer to a single dialect, but covers all the clans forming part of a dialect chain  between the Kendall and Holroyd Rivers, and that the local name for the cluster is local term is Kugu-Nganycharra (known at Cape Keerweer as Wik-Ngenycharra.

Notes

Citations

Sources

      

Aboriginal peoples of Queensland
Australian Aboriginal culture
Far North Queensland